Jhilay is a small village near niwai to boli road [tonk], Rajasthan, India. Art and Unseant Rajmahal (Palace). The fortress of the splinter is divided into two parts ... 1 Black Ford whose height is 40 and 60 meters: It is situated on a mountain. 2 ford is a Shahi Mahal: which was built for the rest of the king and queen Approximate population is around 10,000.

Its near Niwai which is a  vegetable oil hub. Near Niwai is Banasthali Vidhyapeeth

Villages in Tonk district